Caminophantis is a monotypic genus of moths of the family Yponomeutidae. It presently includes only one species that was described from Fiji.

Species
Caminophantis mystolitha - Meyrick, 1933 

Yponomeutidae